Yerassyl Kazhibayev (born 4 July 1994) is a Kazakhstani judoka.

He is the silver medallist of the 2019 Judo Grand Prix Marrakesh in the +100 kg category.

References

External links
 

1994 births
Living people
Kazakhstani male judoka
20th-century Kazakhstani people
21st-century Kazakhstani people